The swimming competition at the 1996 Summer Olympics was held at the Georgia Tech Aquatic Center in Atlanta, United States. There were 762 competitors from 117 countries. This was the last Olympics where swimming B-finals were held.

At the time of the games, the facility had a temporary 50m warm-up pool located behind the locker rooms and entry concourse (on the ground); as well as a temporary roof, and open walls (there were wall-like structures/curtains at the diving well and turning end of the pool). The open walls allowed for temporary seating to be in place during the games. A wall and new roof have since been placed on the facility.

A total of 4 world records and 13 Olympic records were set during the competition

The women's 4 x 200 metre freestyle relay made its debut at these Games.

Medal table

Medal summary

Men's events

* Swimmers who participated in the heats only and received medals.

Women's events

* Swimmers who participated in the heats only and received medals.

Olympic and world records broken 

Note: Any world record is also an Olympic record

Men

Women

Participating nations
762 swimmers from 117 nations competed.

References

External links
 Swim rankings results

 
O
1996 Summer Olympics events
1996